"Get Back" is a song by The Beatles.

Get Back may also refer to:

Film and television
Get Back (film), a 1991 Paul McCartney concert movie
Get Back (TV series), a 1992 British sitcom
The Beatles: Get Back, a 2021 documentary series

Music

Albums
Get Back (The Beatles album), a music and film project by The Beatles, resulting in the album Let It Be and the film of the same title
Get Back (Basics album), 2003
Get Back (Pink Mountaintops album), 2014

Songs 
"Get Back" (Demi Lovato song), 2008
"Get Back" (Ludacris song), 2005
"Get Back" (Zebrahead song), 1998
"Get Back", a song by Britney Spears from Blackout
"Get Back", a song by Veruca Salt from American Thighs
"Get Back (ASAP)", a 2011 song by Alexandra Stan
"Get Back", a song by Pop Smoke from his mixtape Meet the Woo 2

See also
 Got Back, a 2022 North American concert tour by Paul McCartney
 Get Back – Together, a 1997 album by the Quarrymen
 Let It Be (1970 film), a documentary about the Beatles whose original planned title was Get Back